Maio Island may refer to:

 Maio, Cape Verde
 Maio, one of the Bissagos Islands in Guinea-Bissau